The JL-2 (NATO reporting name CSS-N-14) is a Chinese second-generation intercontinental-range submarine-launched ballistic missile (SLBM) deployed on the People's Liberation Army Navy's (PLAN) Type 094 submarines. It succeeds the JL-1 SLBM deployed on the Type 092 submarine.

The JL-2 provides China with its first viable sea-based nuclear deterrent.

Development
The JL-2 is a naval variant of the land-based DF-31. Their common 2-metre diameter solid fuel rocket motor was successfully tested in late 1983, and research and development efforts were reorganized starting in 1985 to produce both missiles.

The first JL-2 at-sea launch occurred in 2001 from a Type 031 submarine. The program was delayed after a failed test in 2004. Successful launches occurred in 2005 and 2008. The missile was successfully fired from a Type 094 submarine, the intended operational platform, for the first time in 2009. A series of test launches occurred in 2012. Another test launch occurred in January 2015.

During the development of the missile, it was reported that China was considering modifying the missile to accommodate an anti-satellite warhead to give it a sea-based anti-satellite capability.

Type 094 deterrence patrols with JL-2 missiles began in December 2015.

, 48 JL-2 launchers are deployed on submarines.

Description
Its payload is a single 1 Megaton warhead or 3-8 MIRVs with yields of 20, 90, or 150kt.

See also
 JL-1
 JL-3
 R-29 Vysota
 R-29RM Shtil
 R-29RMU Sineva
 R-29RMU2 Layner
 RSM-56 Bulava
 UGM-133 Trident II
 M45 (missile)
 M51 (missile)
 K Missile family
 Pukkuksong-1
 R-39 Rif
 R-39M

References

Citations

Sources

External links
 CSIS Missile Threat - Ju Lang-2
 JL-2 from Mark Wade's Encyclopedia Astronautica

Submarine-launched ballistic missiles of the People's Republic of China
Nuclear weapons of the People's Republic of China
1980s establishments in China
Military equipment introduced in the 2010s